South Bethlehem may refer to:

South Bethlehem Downtown Historic District in Bethlehem, Pennsylvania in the Lehigh Valley
South Bethlehem, New York in Albany County, New York
South Bethlehem, Pennsylvania in western Pennsylvania